Syzygium ampliflorum is a species of plant in the family Myrtaceae. It is a tree endemic to Java in Indonesia. It is a critically endangered species threatened by habitat loss.

References

ampliflorum
Endemic flora of Java
Critically endangered plants
Taxonomy articles created by Polbot